Saint Gudula was born in the pagus of Brabant (in present-day Belgium). According to her 11th-century biography (Vita Gudilae), written by a monk of the abbey of Hautmont between 1048 and 1051, she was the daughter of a duke of Lotharingia called Witger and Amalberga of Maubeuge. She died between 680 and 714.

Her name is connected to several places:
Moorsel (where she lived)
Brussels (where a chapter in her honour was founded in 1047)
Eibingen (where the relic of her skull is conserved).

In Brabant she is usually called Goedele or Goule; (later ,).

Life
The mother of Gudula, Saint Amalberga, embraced the religious life in the abbey of Maubeuge. She received the veil from the hands of St. Aubert, Bishop of Cambrai (d. about 668). Gudula had two sisters, St. Pharaildis and St. Reineldis, and one brother, Saint Emebertus.

Gudula was educated in the abbey of Nivelles by her godmother, Gertrude of Nivelles. When Gertrude died, she moved back to her home at Moorsel, spending her time in good works and religious devotion. She frequently visited the church of Moorsel, situated about two miles from her parents' house.

Gudula died and was buried at Hamme (Flemish Brabant). Later her relics were removed to the church of St. Salvator in Moorsel, where the body was interred behind the altar. During the reign of Charles, Duke of Lower Lorraine (977–992), the body of the saint was transferred to Saint Gaugericus' chapel in Brussels. Lambert II, Count of Leuven, (d. 1054) founded a chapter in 1047 in honour of Saint Gudula. Bishop Gerardus I of Cambrai (d. 1051) led the translation of her relics to the church of Saint Michael in Brussels. The church later became the famous Cathedral of St. Michael and St. Gudula.

On 6 June 1579, the collegiate church was pillaged and wrecked by the Protestant Geuzen ("Beggars"), and the relics of the saint were disinterred and scattered.

Veneration

 Along with St. Michael, Gudula is a patron saint of Brussels.
 The feast of Saint Gudula is generally celebrated on 8 January (the day she died according her hagiography). However, in the diocese of Ghent (where Moorsel is situated) her feast is held on 19 January.
 Charlemagne made donations to the convent of Moorsel in her honour.

 The flower called tremella deliquescens, which bears fruit in the beginning of January, is known as Sinte Goedele's lampken (St. Gudula's lantern).
 The woodcarvers who produced statues of the saints born in the Holy Roman Empire, often depicted St. Gudula with a taper in her hand, but this originates probably out of confusion with the Paris Saint Geneveva tradition. 
 The skull of St. Gudula is conserved in the Catholic Church of St. Hildegard in Eibingen, Germany.

Iconography
 Gudula is often pictured holding a lantern. She is depicted on a seal of the Church of St. Gudula of 1446 holding in her right hand a candle, and in her left a lamp, which a demon tries to extinguish. This refers to the legend that the saint went to church before cock-crow. The demon, wishing to stray her off the right way, extinguished the candle, but the saint obtained from God that her lantern should be rekindled.

See also
 Saint Gudula, patron saint archive

References

Sources

Primary sources
 Vita prima sanctae Gudilae auctore anonymo on the Latin Wikisource
 Vita ampliata sanctae Gudilae auctore Huberto on the Latin Wikisource
 Bollandus J., Henschenius G., De S. Gudila Virgine Bruxellis in Belgio, Acta Sanctorum Januarii I (1643) 524–530.

Secondary sources
 Bonenfant, P., 'La charte de foundation du chapitre de Sainte-Gudule à Bruxelles', Bulletin de la Commission Royale d'Histoire 115 (1950) 17–58.
 Podevijn, R., 'Hubert, l'auteur de la vita Gudulae', Revue Belge de Philologie et d'Histoire 15 (1936) 489–496.
 Podevijn, 'Etude critique sur la Vita Gudulae', Revue Belge de Philologie et d'Histoire 2 (1923) 619–641.
 Lefèvre, P., 'Une conjecture à propos de la date et de l'auteur du "Vita Gudile"', Belgisch Tijdschrift voor Filologie en Geschiedenis 14/1 (Brussel 1935) 98–101.
 van der Essen, L., 'Etude critique et littéraire sur les vitae des saints Mérovingiens', Recueil de travaux publiées par les membres des conférences d'histoire et de philologie 17 (Leuven 1907) 296–311.
 Riethe, P., 'Der Schädel der heiligen Gudula aus der Pfarrkirche von Eibingen. Eine historisch-anthropologische Studie', Nassauische Annalen Jahrbuch des Vereins für nassauische Altertumskunde und Geschichtsforschung Band 67 (1956) 233.
 Van Droogenbroeck, F. J., 'Paltsgraaf Wigerik van Lotharingen, inspiratiebron voor de legendarische graaf Witger in de Vita Gudilae', Eigen Schoon en De Brabander 93 (2010) 113–136.
 Van Droogenbroeck, F. J., 'Kritisch onderzoek naar de interacties tussen de Vita S. Gudilae en de Gesta Episcoporum Cameracensium.', Eigen Schoon en De Brabander 95 (2012) 311–346.
 Van Droogenbroeck, F. J., 'Onulfus van Hautmont (ca. 1048), auteur van de Vita S. Gudilae anonymo', Eigen Schoon en De Brabander 95 (2012) 595–643.
 Van Droogenbroeck, F. J.,  Nova miracula de exemplis veteribus (2016)

External links 

 St Michael and St Gudula Cathedral, Brussels
 Pfarrei St. Hildegard, Eibingen with Information of the Church and the shrine of saint Gudula

7th-century births
8th-century deaths
Belgian Roman Catholic saints
7th-century Frankish women
8th-century Frankish saints
Christian female saints of the Middle Ages
People from Aalst, Belgium